Andrea Longo may refer to:

Andrea Longo (runner) (born 1975), Italian middle-distance runner
Andrea Longo (skier) (born 1971), Italian Nordic combined competitor